Juan de Quevedo (:es:Vejorís, c. 1450 – December 24, 1519) was a Spanish Franciscan priest and the first Bishop of Santa María de La Antigua del Darién in Panama (1513–1519).

Biography
Juan de Quevedo was born in Vejorís, Cantabria, Spain and ordained a priest in the Order of Friars Minor. On September 9, 1513 - at the request of King Ferdinand, husband of Queen Isabella - Pope Leo X appointed him Bishop of Santa María de La Antigua del Darién On January 29, 1514, he was consecrated by bishop by Diego de Deza, Archbishop of Seville.

He left for the Indies in 1514 along with Hernando de Luque on a fleet commanded by Pedro Arias Dávila. Conflict between Quevedo and Arias Dávila soon ensued as Quevedo strongly protested against the cruel acts committed by the governor and his officers, not only against the Indians, but also against rivals, such as the beheading of Vasco Nuñez de Balboa, the discoverer of the Pacific Ocean. Counter charges were brought against Quevedo with Bartolomé de Las Casas accusing him of having violated a trust, accumulated wealth, and neglected the Indians, but the veracity of Las Casas' accusations has not been established. Quevedo returned to Spain in (1518) and presented two memorials to King Charles. One was against Arias Dávila, and the other advocated restricting the powers of all governors in the New World for the better protection of the natives. When these documents were shown to Las Casas, in spite of differences between the two, he offered to countersign them. Bishop Quevedo soon fell sick and died at Barcelona.

In spite of Quevedo's record as a champion of the rights of Native Americans, his views were still coloured by his time and his missionary fervour. He regarded all the aborigines of America to be a race of men whom it would be impossible to instruct or improve unless they were collected in villages or missions and kept under continual supervision.

References

External links and additional sources
 (for Chronology of Bishops) 
 (for Chronology of Bishops) 

1450 births
1519 deaths
Spanish Franciscans
Spanish Roman Catholic bishops in North America
16th-century Roman Catholic bishops in Panama
15th-century Castilian Roman Catholic priests
Roman Catholic bishops of Panamá